Actinia priapus is an unaccepted scientific name and may refer to:
 Calliactis parasitica, a species of sea anemone
 Metridium farcimen, the giant plumose anemone